Barry Madlener (born 6 January 1969) is a Dutch politician serving as a member of the House of Representatives since 2012. A member of the Party for Freedom (PVV), he was first elected to the House of Representatives in 2006. Madlener became the PVV's leader in the European Parliament following the 2009 election, an office he resigned from upon his reelection to the House of Representatives in 2012.

Biography

Early life
During his youth, Madlener lived in the south seaside village of Oostvoorne with his parents and older sister. He later moved to Rotterdam for his studies. After graduating from high school he became a real estate agent and spent a number of years selling commercial real estate. On 14 March 2002 he was inaugurated as a member of the municipal council of Rotterdam for Livable Rotterdam. Together with Kay van der Linde he was also involved in establishing the Livable Netherlands political party.

Livable Rotterdam
At the 2002 municipal election, Madlener was listed eleventh on the Livable Rotterdam list, the local party whose leader Pim Fortuyn was assassinated later that year. Madlener was considered a confidant of Fortuyn. The party won 17 seats in these historical elections on 6 March 2002. As a municipal councillor Madlener was infrastructure spokesman. In that function he was an outspoken supporter of the construction of a campus at the Erasmus University Rotterdam. He was also in favour of prohibiting municipal civil servants wearing a veil. He put forward two proposals: a proposal to prohibit carrying religious symbols for all civil servants, as well as a second proposal to the same effect for teachers and support staff at schools. He also stated that physical education at Muslim schools should be a mixed gender class.

National and European politics
Elected to the House of Representatives in the 2006 general election, he was placed seventh on the Party for Freedom list led by Geert Wilders. Madlener resigned as a Rotterdam municipal councillor on 1 July 2007. He led the PVV in the 2009 European Parliament election before returning to the House of Representatives following the 2012 election. Since the 2017 election he has been party spokesman for infrastructure.

Personal life
Madlener, a resident of Rockanje, has a relationship with Jelena, a Croatian by origin, with whom he lives as of 2002. They met at the party office of Livable Rotterdam. Madlener noted in an HP/De Tijd interview that most Livable Rotterdam party officials have foreign life partners; that this peculiarity seems to continue in the PVV, as party leader Geert Wilders is married to a Hungarian.

References
  Parlement.com biography

1969 births
Dutch real estate brokers
Livable Rotterdam politicians
Pim Fortuyn List politicians 
Living people
Members of the House of Representatives (Netherlands)
MEPs for the Netherlands 2009–2014
Municipal councillors of Rotterdam
Party for Freedom MEPs
Party for Freedom politicians
People from Leiden
People from Westvoorne